Tapinocephalus ("humble head") is an extinct genus of large herbivorous dinocephalians that lived during the Middle Permian Period. These stocky, barrel-bodied animals were characterised by a massive bony skull roof and short weak snout. It is thought that, like the rest of the members of its family, the animals engaged in head-butting intraspecific behavior, possibly for territory or mates. 
 
The fossil remains (skull and postcranial elements) of Tapinocephalus are known from the Lower, Middle, and Upper part of the Tapinocephalus Assemblage Zone ( Capitanian age) of the Lower Beaufort Beds of the South African Karoo. Only the type species, T. atherstonei is now considered valid for this genus.

Classification

Tapinocephalus atherstonei is known from a number of skulls and postcranial bones. The skull is large with a heavily pachyostotic skull roof, a massive bony frontals and a short weak Moschops-like snout. Taurops is a synonym. Phocosaurus megischion  is another synonym differing only in that the transition from the frontals to the snout is not abrupt.

See also

 List of therapsids

Sources
 Boonstra, L.D. 1956, "The skull of Tapinocephalus and its near relatives" Annals of the South African Museum, 43 Part 3 pp. 137–169, 17 figs, plate 4.
 ----- 1969. The fauna of the Tapinocephalus Zone (Beaufort beds of the Karoo). Ann. S. Afr. Mus. 56:1–73. 
 King, Gillian M., 1988 "Anomodontia" Part 17 C, Encyclopedia of Paleoherpetology, Gutsav Fischer Verlag, Stuttgart and New York.

External links

 Tapinocephalia - Tapinocephalus - Palaeos

Tapinocephalians
Prehistoric therapsid genera
Guadalupian synapsids of Africa
Fossil taxa described in 1876
Taxa named by Richard Owen